Pralong is both a given name and a surname. Notable people with the name include: 

Candide Pralong (born 1990), Swiss skier
Pralong Sawandee (born 1987), Thai footballer